Kaichi Hirate (March 12, 1909May 10, 1946) was a Captain in the Japanese Imperial Army. During World War II, he was commandant of the First Branch Camp at Hakodate. In 1946, Hirate was charged with mistreating of prisoners of war resulting in death. He was tried by a U.S. military tribunal at the Yokohama War Crimes Trials. Hirate was found guilty, sentenced to death, and hanged at Sugamo Prison in 1946.

References

1909 births
1946 deaths
Imperial Japanese Army officers
Japanese military personnel of World War II
Japanese people executed for war crimes
People executed by the United States military by hanging